Löwenberger Land is a municipality in the Oberhavel district, in the German state of Brandenburg, about 50 km north of Berlin.

Overview
Established on December 31, 1997 it consists of 15 villages:

Löwenberg was first mentioned in a 1269 deed, when it was acquired by the Bishopric of Brandenburg from the Brandenburg Margraves. A Gothic fieldstone church was erected in the 13th century. The church and large parts of the village were devastated by a fire in 1808. In 1877 Löwenberg gained access to the new Prussian Nordbahn railway line from Berlin to Neubrandenburg.

Members included the Berlin military commander Kuno von Moltke, the later Chancellor Bernhard von Bülow and Emperor Wilhelm II. The circle broke up in 1907 with the Harden-Eulenburg Affair.

Transportation
Löwenberg is situated at the junction of the Bundesstraßen 96 and 167. The Löwenberg railway station is served by the Nordbahn line from Berlin to Stralsund. In east-west direction train connections are also available toward Prenzlau and Rheinsberg. Further Nordbahn railway stations are also in the villages of Grüneberg and Nassenheide.

Notable people
 Libertas Schulze-Boysen, Resistance fighter, born November 20, 1913 in Paris, died December 22, 1942 in Berlin Plötzensee Prison, granddaughter of Philipp zu Eulenburg, spent her childhood at Liebenberg Castle.

Some historical sites

Demography

References

External links

 Liebenberg Castle 

Localities in Oberhavel